"We'll Run Away" is a song by the American rock band the Beach Boys from their 1964 album All Summer Long. Written by Brian Wilson and Gary Usher, the song is a doo-wop ballad in 12/8 time.  The lyrics are about a young couple wishing to elope, and their respective parents are warning them against such an impulse.

Recording
The song was recorded on April 29 and May 18, 1964 at United Western Recorders. Historian Andrew Doe notes that the April 29 date may have been erroneously labelled.

Critical reception
Music journalist Nick Kent wrote that, with "We'll Run Away", Wilson and Usher "zeroed in" on a certain type of teen angst that would culminate more fully in Wilson's "Wouldn't It Be Nice". Jonny Abrams of Rocksucker wrote: "'We'll Run Away' is such a languid, pretty little thing that it’s easy to overlook but repeated listens reveal it to be the kind of innocently romantic pop marvel that so frequently punctuated The Beach Boys’ early output."

References

1964 songs
The Beach Boys songs
Songs written by Brian Wilson
Songs written by Gary Usher
Song recordings produced by Brian Wilson
Songs about marriage
Doo-wop songs